Cotahuasi Canyon (from Quechua Kutawasi), near the city of Arequipa in Peru, is one of the deepest canyons in the world. The Cotahuasi River eroded the canyon between two mountain massifs: the Coropuna and the Solimana.

It receives the tributaries of the Wayllapaña River in the neighborhood of Pampamarka, to the north, and the Huarcaya near Tumipampa, to the west, and is later joined by the Maran River to form the Ocoña River, which ends at the Pacific Ocean.

Location 
Cotahuasi is located at the highest Andean point of Arequipa, in the south of Peru : UTM 683,370 & 790,415 East & 8’275,582 & 8’380,125 North. Between 14°40´22" & 15°35´27" south latitude, 72°19´15" & 73°18´08" west longitude.

This province is characterized by its steep relief: incised by rivers and gullies, ranging between 1,000 and 6,093 metres, with 19 ecological zones.  As is the case with cultures all over the world, the people of highland Arequipa Province are also changing with the times. Nonetheless, the altitude and remoteness of this region mean that residents have retained many of the practices that are now no longer common in neighboring regions.

Access 
The only road leading to the canyon goes through Chuquibamba in the Condesuyos province, then Aplao in Castilla Province. It begins on the Panamerican Highway near Arequipa.
Four bus companies start daily from the Arequipa bus terminal, between 4 and 6 pm. The bus drive is 10–12 hours long, on a road which is unpaved after Chuquibamba. It also goes quite high, through a 4500m pass between Coropuna and Solimana.

Protected area 
The Cotahuasi Subbasin is a landscape park set up by a 2005 decree.
This natural reserve preserves an integrated environment where man and nature are living in close harmony, in a preserved cultural microcosm.
The difficult topographic conditions have generated specific landscapes like agricultural terraces.

Agriculture 
Organic agriculture includes many plants in the reserve : kiwicha, quinoa, mint, dark maize, llacon, fava, oca, beans, arveja (pea), chulpi maize, anise, tarwi. These products are meant to give priority to food supplies to the province. Therefore, very little is produced for export.
Food autonomy is reached thanks to ecological techniques, rational use of water, promotion of improved seeds, conservation of biodiversity, strengthening of producer associations, and complementary livestock breeding.

Tourism 
The Cotahuasi landscape reserve is a preserved area. The landscapes have a large biodiversity including many endemic medicinal plants : muña, retama, tara, coca, jara (malva sylvestris), ruda (ruta graveolens), kiwicha, yareta (azorella compacta).

The landscapes are quite many, from the rivers at the bottom of the canyon to the cold desert areas of the summits. There are 12 different ecosystems in Cotahuasi reserve.
There are also a number of Inca and pre-Inca works including the many agricultural terraces still in use today. The region is also rich with culture and traditions, preserved by ancient Andean people : weaving, colonial churches, Inca tracks, numerous festivals.

See also 
 Colca Canyon
 Cotahuasi Subbasin Landscape Reserve
 Natural and Cultural Peruvian Heritage
 Wiñaw

References

External links
La Union province
Cotahuasi portal
Huaynacotas village
Rafting the Cotahuasi: One Woman's Whitewater Adventure - Jess Tuerk
Rio Cotahuasi - Robert Bart
Rio Cotahuasi River Write Up - Kurt Casey
 www.aedes.com.pe / Images of plants in the Cotahuasi Subbasin Landscape Reserve (Spanish)

Landforms of Arequipa Region
Protected areas established in 2005
Landscape reserves of Peru
Canyons and gorges of Peru
Tourist attractions in Arequipa Region

qu:Kutawasi qhichwa risirwa